Center Township is one of ten townships in Marshall County, Indiana, United States. As of the 2010 census, its population was 15,593 and it contained 6,491 housing units.

Center Township was established in 1836.

Geography

Cities, towns, villages
 Plymouth (vast majority)

Unincorporated towns
 Inwood at 
(This list is based on USGS data and may include former settlements.)

Cemeteries
The township contains these five cemeteries: Nighthart, Oak Hill, Saint Michaels, Salem and Tabor.

Major highways

Airports and landing strips
 Plymouth Municipal Airport
 Tri State Airport

Lakes
 Dixon Lake
 Lawrence Lake

Landmarks
 Centennial Park
 The Lewis and Sarah Boggs House, Jacoby Church and Cemetery, Marshall County Infirmary, and Hoham-Klinghammer-Weckerle House and Brewery Site are listed on the National Register of Historic Places.

Education
 Plymouth Community School Corporation

Center Township residents may obtain a free library card from the Plymouth Public Library in Plymouth.

Political districts
 Indiana's 2nd congressional district
 State House District 17
 State Senate District 5

References
 
 United States Census Bureau 2008 TIGER/Line Shapefiles
 IndianaMap

External links
 Indiana Township Association
 United Township Association of Indiana
 City-Data.com page for Center Township

Townships in Marshall County, Indiana
Townships in Indiana